Jock Murray may refer to:
 Thomas John Murray (born 1938), Canadian neurologist, medical historian and author
 Jock Murray (publisher) (1941-1993), John Murray VI of John Murray publishing house